Prochilodus nigricans, or black prochilodus, is a species of prochilodontid fish from the Amazon Basin in South America. It supports major fisheries; according to IBAMA, it is the third most caught taxon in the Brazilian Amazon by weight, after Brachyplatystoma vaillantii and Semaprochilodus spp. The black prochilodus is migratory, moving between different parts of the Amazon.

References

Prochilodontidae
Taxa named by Johann Baptist von Spix
Taxa_named_by_Louis_Agassiz
Fish described in 1829